Capital Gains is a British radio comedy series which aired originally between 1994 and 1997. There were nine half-hour episodes, broadcast on BBC Radio 4. It starred Peter Jones, and was written by Collin Johnson.

Plot Synopsis 

Retired widower Julius Hutch (played by Peter Jones) is beset by bills he cannot pay. Unexpectedly, a large sum of money is paid into his bank account by a foreign merchant bank. When queried, the overseas bank insists that no mistake has been made, so he sets out to spend his windfall of four million pounds.

The episodes of the first series explore the unanticipated problems which arise for both millionaire Julius Hutch and the merchant bank, as a consequence of the unexpected credit transfer, when he attempts to use his windfall to help other people. In the second series, where he accidentally becomes a billionaire, Julius devotes his new found financial muscle to supporting worthwhile ecological causes, with further unexpected consequences.

This is fundamentally a comedy about the small man versus big business. The humour arises because his unexpected wealth enables the little man to give his corporate opponents a good run for their money! The first series deals with Julius Hutch versus a banking corporation, and the second series deals with Hutch taking on a property developer.

Writer Collin Johnson plays various small parts in the episodes throughout both the first and second series. The show is also to some extent a romcom, as both series also explore Hutch's developing romance with a lady named Pauline, who works in the local branch of his High Street bank, played by Celestine Randall. His daughter from his first marriage, Kate, is played by Justine Midda. BBC announcer Brian Perkins plays small parts in some episodes, in addition to his regular announcing duties on the show.

Pilot Episode 

A pilot episode aired on Tuesday 5 April 1994 on Radio 4, in a slot entitled "Thirty Minute Theatre: Capital Gains". The 1994 pilot was subsequently aired as the second episode of Series 1, in 1995, and because of this it was the only episode not to carry an individual episode title.

Cast:

  Julius Hutch ... Peter Jones
  Pauline Tone ... Celestine Randall
  Creditor ....... Collin Johnson
  Creditor ....... Peter Whitman

First Series 

Series 1 Episode 1 (of 4): Risk Capital. Starring Peter Jones. Written by Collin Johnson. Producer Andy Jordan.
First broadcast on Radio 4, in April 1995.

  Julius Hutch ....... Peter Jones
  Mrs Pauline Tone ... Celestine Randall
  Kate ............... Justine Midda
  Sexton Lewis ....... Jeffrey Wickham 
  News Reader ........ Collin Johnson

Series 1 Episode 2 (of 4): Untitled. Starring Peter Jones. Written by Collin Johnson. Producer Andy Jordan.
First broadcast on Radio 4, in April 1995.

  Julius Hutch ... Peter Jones
  Pauline Tone ... Celestine Randall
  Creditor ....... Collin Johnson
  Creditor ....... Peter Whitman

Series 1 Episode 3 (of 4): Venture Capital. Starring Peter Jones as Julius Hutch. With Celestine Randall as Mrs Pauline Tone, Justine Midda as Kate, Peter Whitman as Peter Fang, Jeffrey Wickham as Sexton Lewis, and Collin Johnson as the News Reader. Script by Collin Johnson. Producer Andy Jordan.
First broadcast on Radio 4, in April 1995.

Series 1 Episode 4 (of 4): Capital Return. Starring Peter Jones as Julius Hutch. With Celestine Randall as Mrs Pauline Tone, Justine Midda as Kate, Peter Whitman as Peter Fang, Jeffrey Wickham as Sexton Lewis, and Collin Johnson as the News Reader. Script by Collin Johnson. Producer Andy Jordan.
First broadcast on Radio 4, in April 1995.

Second Series 

Series 2 Episode 1: Seed Capital. Starring Peter Jones as Julius Hutch. With Celestine Randall as his wife Pauline, Justine Midda as his daughter Kate, Jeffrey Wickham as Sexton Lewis, Stephen Thorne as Sir Gainford Blounty, and Jillie Meers as Dahlia Sprout. Other parts played by Collin Johnson, David Holt, and the show's Announcer, Brian Perkins. Script by Collin Johnson. Producers Andy Jordan and David Blount.
First broadcast on Radio 4, in July 1997.

Series 2 Episode 2: Stake Capital. With Celestine Randall as Mrs Pauline Hutch, Justine Midda as Kate, Jeffrey Wickham as Sexton Lewis, Stephen Thorne as Sir Gainford Blounty, Jillie Meers as Dahlia Sprout, Collin Johnson as Haiku Jack, David Holt as Ted, and Brian Perkins as himself. Script by Collin Johnson. Producers Andy Jordan and David Blount.
First broadcast on Radio 4, in July 1997.

Series 2 Episode 3: Development Capital. Starring Peter Jones as Julius Hutch. With Celestine Randall as Mrs Pauline Hutch, Justine Midda as Kate, Jeffrey Wickham as Sexton Lewis, Stephen Thorne as Sir Gainford Blounty, Jillie Meers as Dahlia Sprout, David Holt as Ted Smoothie, and Brian Perkins as himself. Script by Collin Johnson. Producers Andy Jordan and David Blount.
First broadcast on Radio 4, in July 1997.

Series 2 Episode 4: Political Capital. Starring Peter Jones as Julius Hutch. With Celestine Randall as Mrs Pauline Hutch, Justine Midda as Kate, Jeffrey Wickham as Sexton Lewis, Stephen Thorne as Sir Gainford Blounty, Jillie Meers as Dahlia Sprout, Collin Johnson as Haiku Jack, Hugh Dickson as the Colonel, Toni G Barry as Liz Dangerfield, and Brian Perkins as himself. Script by Collin Johnson. Producers Andy Jordan and David Blount.
First broadcast on Radio 4, in July 1997.

Episodes
A pilot episode aired on 5 April 1994 in a Radio 4 FM slot entitled Thirty Minute Theatre: Capital Gains.

Series One

Series Two

References

 Lavalie, John. Capital Gains. EpGuides. 21 Jul 2005. 29 Jul 2005  <https://web.archive.org/web/20070816225402/http://epguides.com/CapitalGains/%3E.

BBC Radio 4 programmes
1994 radio programme debuts